Trihydroxyacetophenone may refer to:

 2,4,6-Trihydroxyacetophenone
 Gallacetophenone (2,3,4-trihydroxyacetophenone)